Mahathi S, known by the mononym Mahathi is a Carnatic musician and playback singer for film songs in Tamil, Telugu, Hindi languages.

Family
Mahathi is from a musicians family father Thiruvaiyaru P. Sekar is a vocalist and a disciple of Dr. M. Balamuralikrishna.  Her mother Smt. Vasanthi Sekar, a flautist, is the grand disciple of Sri. T. R. Mahalingam, Sri. N. Ramani and Smt. Kesi. Mahathi is also the great grand daughter of the violinist Sangeetha Kalanidhi Pazhamaneri Swaminatha Iyer.

Career

Mahathi underwent her initial musical training from her parents and from Deepa Gayatri of Trivandrum. When Mahathi's family moved to Trichur, she was put under the guidance of Sri. Mangad. K. Natesan. Mahathi underwent advanced Musical Training under the tutelage of Padma Bhushan “ Sangeetha Kalanidhi “ Madurai  Shri. T. N. Seshagopalan. Mahathi has been awarded the Central Govt Scholarship for Carnatic Music in 1994.

Playback singing
Mahathi's started playback singing in 2003 with a duet, "Iyyaiyyo Pudichirukku", with Hariharan, under the music direction of Harris Jayaraj in movie, Saamy. In 2008, Mahathi won the Tamil Nadu State Film Award for Best Female Playback Singer for the song "Naeraa Varattuma" from the movie "Nenje Nenje".

Discography

Television works
Mahathi presented the music based quiz program, "Aaha Paadalam" on Doordarshan Podhigai TV with Raaghav. In October 2005 she presented Ilaiyaraja's Live-in Concert organised by Jaya TV, "Andrum Indrum Endrum" with actor Parthiban.

Titles, awards, and other recognition

2008, Tamil Nadu State Film Award for Best Female Playback (for "Naeraa Varattuma" from Nenjathai Killadhe)
2008, ITFA Best Female Playback Award (for "Mudhal Mazhai" from Bheema)
2011, "The Chord Wizard" (title), WE Magazine, Chennai, India
2017, Tamil Nadu State Film Award for Best Female Playback (for "Nenje Nenje" from Ayan)

References 

21st-century Indian singers
21st-century Indian women singers
Carnatic singers
Women Carnatic singers
Hari Sri Vidya Nidhi School alumni
Indian women classical singers
Indian women playback singers
Living people
Singers from Chennai
Tamil Nadu State Film Awards winners
Tamil playback singers
Women musicians from Tamil Nadu
Year of birth missing (living people)